Aethes triangulana is a moth of the family Tortricidae. It was described by Treitschke in 1835. It is found from most of Europe to Central Asia, the Amur region, China and Japan.

The moth flies from May to June.

The larvae feed on Veronica longifolia.

Subspecies
Aethes triangulana triangulana
Aethes triangulana excellentana (Christoph, 1881) (Russia: Ussuri, Amur; Japan; China: Heilongjiang, Henan)

References

External links

Swedish Moths
lepidoptera.pl

triangulana
Moths described in 1835
Taxa named by Georg Friedrich Treitschke
Tortricidae of Europe
Moths of Asia